Hamed Al-Wahaibi (born 20 January 1968 in Muscat) is a rally driver from Oman and a former WRC driver. He is the first WRC competitor from Oman.

Rally Career
In 1999, Al Wahaibi set a new record after his participation in the Finland Rally, becoming the first Arab driver to have 30 World Rally Championships to his credit.

By the end of 1999. Al Wahaibi was considered to be the first Arab driver to lead the group N World Rally Championship. Al Wahaibi eventually finished the season in second place, the
highest finish ever by an Arab driver.

In 2001, Al Wahaibi won the Rallye Terre D'Auvergene, the second round of the French Gravel Rally Championship, and became the first Arab and possibly non-European rallyist to have won the French event.

References

External links
Al-Wahaibi at ewrc-results.com

Living people
1968 births
Omani rally drivers
World Rally Championship drivers
People from Muscat, Oman